Lecanto is an unincorporated community and census-designated place (CDP) in Citrus County, Florida, United States. As of the 2010 census it had a population of 5,882, up from 5,161 in 2000. It is home to several county government facilities such as the Citrus County Sheriff's Office and the Citrus Campus of the College of Central Florida.

Geography
Lecanto is located at the geographic center of Citrus County at  (28.8488, -82.4811). State Road 44 (Gulf to Lake Highway) runs through the center of the CDP, leading west  to Crystal River and east  to Inverness, the county seat.

Demographics

At the 2000 census there were 5,161 people, 1,861 households, and 1,369 families in the CDP. The racial makup of the CDP was 93.88% White, 2.96% African American, 0.76% Native American, 0.76% Asian, 0.02% Pacific Islander, 0.43% from other races, and 1.20% from two or more races. Hispanic or Latino of any race were 2.71%.

Of the 1,861 households 25.8% had children under the age of 18 living with them, 61.8% were married couples living together, 7.9% had a female householder with no husband present, and 26.4% were non-families. 22.0% of households were one person and 11.7% were one person aged 65 or older.  The average household size was 2.43 and the average family size was 2.81.

The age distribution was 20.5% under the age of 18, 6.3% from 18 to 24, 23.4% from 25 to 44, 27.1% from 45 to 64, and 22.6% 65 or older. The median age was 45 years. For every 100 females, there were 105.6 males. For every 100 females age 18 and over, there were 101.4 males.

The median household income was $40,826 and the median family income  was $46,987. Males had a median income of $30,625 versus $27,296 for females. The per capita income for the CDP was $20,625.  About 5.3% of families and 9.1% of the population were below the poverty line, including 13.8% of those under age 18 and 4.8% of those age 65 or over.

Lecanto is the site of the privately operated Citrus County Detention Facility, which holds a maximum of 760 prisoners of the county, of the federal government, and prisoners from the Virgin Islands.

Education
The CDP is served by Citrus County Schools. Elementary schools serving sections of the CDP include Lecanto, Forest Ridge, Rock Crusher, and Hernando. Lecanto Middle School and Lecanto High School also serve the CDP.

College of Central Florida's Citrus Campus was built in Lecanto in 1996.

Public transportation
Citrus County Transit has its headquarters in Lecanto, and runs one flex-route service in the area.

References

Census-designated places in Citrus County, Florida
Census-designated places in Florida
Former municipalities in Florida